Sleater-Kinney is an American rock band that formed in Olympia, Washington in 1994. The band's discography consists of 10 studio albums, one live album, one compilation box set, 16 singles, and nine music videos. The band released their debut album, Sleater-Kinney, in 1995 on the independent record label Chainsaw Records. The band's second album, Call the Doctor, was released in 1996 to critical acclaim, cementing the band's reputation as one of the major musical acts from the Pacific Northwest. Dig Me Out, Sleater-Kinney's third album, was released the following year on Kill Rock Stars. It became one of their most successful albums, appearing on several publications' best album lists.

Sleater-Kinney released their fourth album, The Hot Rock, in 1999. The Hot Rock became the band's first album that entered the US Billboard Top 200 chart. Their next album, All Hands on the Bad One, was released in 2000 and received a nomination for Outstanding Music Album at the 12th Annual Gay and Lesbian Alliance Against Defamation Awards. One Beat, Sleater-Kinney's sixth album, followed in 2002 and met with high critical praise. Sleater-Kinney released their seventh album, The Woods, in 2005 on Sub Pop. The album produced the singles "Entertain" and "Jumpers". In 2006, the band announced an indefinite hiatus. The band's first seven albums had sold a combined total of 583,000 copies in the United States by October 2014.

After a ten-year hiatus, Sleater-Kinney released their eighth studio album, No Cities to Love, in 2015.

Studio albums

Singles 
List of singles, with selected chart positions, showing year released and album name

Live albums

Compilations

Music videos

Other appearances

Notes

References

External links 

Discographies of American artists
Rock music group discographies